Acaulon is a genus of mosses belonging to the family Pottiaceae.

Species:
 Acaulon apiculatum Mitt.
 Acaulon capense Müll.Hal.
 Acaulon casasianum Brugués & H.A.Crum
 Acaulon muticum (Schreb. ex Hedw.) Müll. Hal.

References

Pottiaceae
Moss genera